

Christiania may refer to:

Businesses and organizations
 Christiania Bank, a former Norwegian bank
 Christiania Theatre in Oslo, Norway
 Christiania Spigerverk, a steel company which was founded in Oslo, Norway, in 1853
 Christiania Norwegian Theatre, founded in 1852 under the name of Norwegian Dramatic School
 Christiania Avertissements-Blad, a former Norwegian newspaper, issued in Oslo, 1861–1971

Places
 Christiania or Kristiania, names of Oslo (1624–1924), expression (from 1925) for the part of Oslo that was founded by King Christian IV
 Christiania Islands, a group of islands in the Palmer Archipelago
 Christiania Township, Minnesota, a township in Jackson County, U.S.
 Freetown Christiania (or Christiania), a self-proclaimed autonomous neighborhood in Copenhagen, Denmark

Sports
 Christiania SK, a Norwegian Nordic skiing club, based in Oslo, Norway

Other uses
 Christiania (brachiopod), a genus of Strophomenid brachiopods found in the Arenig geological group
 Christiania Burgher School, a private middle school in Christiania, Norway

See also
 Cristian (disambiguation)
 Christiana (disambiguation)
 Christiania Township (disambiguation)